This article covers the 2012 football season in Chile.

National tournaments

Primera División

Apertura Champion: Club Universidad de Chile
Topscorer: Emanuel Herrera
Clausura  Champion: Huachipato
Topscorer: Sebastián Sáez
Relegated: Unión San Felipe, Deportes La Serena and Universidad de Concepción

Copa Chile

Champion: Club Universidad de Chile

National team results

The Chile national football team results and fixtures for 2012.

2014 World Cup qualifiers

Friendly matches

Record

Goal scorers

External links
The official Chilean Football Association web site

 
Seasons in Chilean football